Nasiha Kapidžić-Hadžić (6 December 1932 – 22 September 1995) was a Bosnian children's author and poet. Her first children's book, Maskenbal u šumi ("Costume Ball in the Woods"), was published in 1962.

Early life
Kapidžić-Hadžić was born in  Banja Luka,  Bosnia and Herzegovina; then Yugoslavia on 6 December 1932, although some sources give her date of birth as 6 November 1931. As a little girl she had leg surgery and wore a cast, rendering her bedridden. Six-year-old Nasiha began writing for the first time during her recovery.

She attended elementary and high school in Banja Luka and moved to Belgrade to study at the University of Belgrade's Faculty of Philosophy, where she earned her academic degree. She later worked as a professor and radio producer for children shows. Her literature was dedicated to children. She even published some textbooks for elementary schools.

Personal life
Kapidžić-Hadžić had a daughter named Aida.

Bibliography
Maskenbal u šumi ("Costume Ball in the Woods", 1962)
Vezeni most ("Embroidered Bridge", 1965)
Od zmaja do viteza ("From Dragon to Knight", 1970)
Skrivena priča ("Hidden Tale", 1971)
Poslanica tiha ("Silent Letter", 1972)
Kad si bila mala ("When You Were a Little Girl", 1973)
San o livadici ("The Dream About Meadows", 1974)
Od tvog grada do mog grada ("From Your City to Mine", 1975)
Glas djetinjstva ("The Voice of Childhood", 1975)
Šare mog šešira ("The Ornaments of My Hat")
Liliput (1977)
Šare djetinjstva ("The Ornaments of Childhood", 1977)
Događaj u Loncipunumu ("The Event in Loncipunum", 1977)
Lete, lete laste ("The Swallows Fly")
Vrbaška uspavanka ("Willow Lullaby")
Vujo, Vučko, Vuk
Krilo i šapa ("Wing and Paw")
Trčimo za suncem ("We Chase After the Sun")
Taj patuljak ("That Dwarf")
Pjetlić, svraka i proljeće ("The Rooster, the Magpie and Springtime")
Sto vukova ("One Hundred Wolves")
Šuma i pahuljice ("The Forest and the Snowflake)
Nenina bašta ("Grandmother's Garden")
Pod beharom moje janje spava ("My Lamb Sleeps Under the Blossoms")

Awards and honors
"Dvadeset-sedmojulska nagrada" (27 July award)
"Veselin Maslesa" award

References

1932 births
1995 deaths
People from Banja Luka
Bosniaks of Bosnia and Herzegovina
University of Belgrade Faculty of Philosophy alumni
Bosniak writers
Bosniak poets
20th-century poets
20th-century Bosnia and Herzegovina writers
20th-century Bosnia and Herzegovina women writers